Rose is the second studio album by German musician Maximilian Hecker, released in 2003 on Kitty-Yo.

Track listing
 Kate Moss
 I am Falling Now
 That's What You Do
 Fool
 My Story
 Daylight
 My Love for You is Insane
 Powderblue
 Never-Ending Days
 My Friends
 Rose

References

2003 albums
Maximilian Hecker albums